The 2012 Euro Cup of Australian rules football was a 9-a-side Footy tournament held in Edinburgh (Scotland) on September 22, 2012, with 16 national men's teams and two women's teams. The men's tournament was won by Ireland who defeated Denmark in the Grand Final by 1 point to claim its second EU Cup Championship. Denmark's Aksel Bang was named Player of the Tournament and was the Leading Goal Kicker.

Venue
Matches were played at Peffermill Fields at the University of Edinburgh in Edinburgh.

Teams

Pools round

William Wallace Group

Andy Murray Group

Chris Hoy Group

Sean Connery Group

Euro Cup Finals

Grand final

Ranking Matches

Bowl Finals

Plate Finals

Women's Match

Final standings
1. Ireland (EU Cup Winners) 
2. Denmark (EU Cup Runners Up) 
3. England (EU Cup 3rd Place Winners) 
4. Italy 
5. Croatia 
6. Germany 
7. Sweden 
8. Finland 
9. France (Bowl Winners) 
10. Spain 
11. Scotland 
12. Wales 
13. Norway (Plate Winners) 
14. Iceland 
15. Czech Republic 
16. Austria

References

External links
 Official site of the 2012 EU Cup

EU Cup
International sports competitions in Edinburgh
Eu Cup Australian Rules Football
Eu Cup Australian Rules Football
Eu Cup Australian Rules Football
Eu Cup Australian Rules Football
2010s in Edinburgh